Dreamchasers 2 is the ninth mixtape by American rapper Meek Mill (hosted by DJ Drama). It was released on May 7, 2012, by Maybach Music Group and Warner Bros. Records, and also released for digital download on DatPiff. It serves as the second installment in the Dreamchasers series, following Dreamchasers (2011). The mixtape features guest appearances from American rappers Travis Scott, Rick Ross, Fabolous, French Montana, Wale, Big Sean, Kendrick Lamar, Mac Miller, 2 Chainz and Canadian rapper Drake – along with singing vocals by Jeremih, Trey Songz and Jordanne; as well as production that was provided by Jahlil Beats, SAP, All Star, Cardiak, Reginald Smith, and Jesse Wilson, among others. The mixtape consists mostly of original material, including a remix to Meek Mill's single from his previous mixtape Dreamchasers, "House Party", and a cover of Drake's "The Ride".

Due to its release a month prior, the mixtape was highly anticipated that has been resulted into a high traffic, causing DatPiff to crash upon the mixtapes eventual release. The mixtape quickly became the most popular mixtape release of all-time on that site, with over 1.5 million downloads within 6 hours of release and over 2.5 million downloads within 24 hours. Meek Mill announced on his Twitter that he would be releasing four extended bonus tracks for a deluxe edition of Dreamchasers 2, which never happened. Instead, he released seven songs without tags. The third track, "Amen" was released as the lead single for Meek Mill's upcoming debut album Dreams and Nightmares, while the fourth track, "Burn" was released as the second single also for his upcoming debut album.

Reception

Critical response 

Upon its release Dreamchasers 2 received generally positive reviews from music critics. Jordan Sargent of Pitchfork Media gave the mixtape a 7.4 out of 10, saying "It won't play as important a role in his narrative as the first edition, and that's saying something considering D2 currently sits at 4.1 million downloads on DatPiff alone. But it is of equal quality to the mixtape that broke him big, and that can only mean good things." Carl Chery of XXL gave the mixtape an XL, saying "The tape reflects an evolution in Meek’s subject matter. While Dreamchasers documented Meek’s struggles, its sequel speaks on hardships in the past tense. At 20 tracks, Dreamchasers 2 is sort of a long-player, but it fulfills its purpose in prepping Meek’s fans for the main event.

Slava Kuperstein of HipHopDX gave the mixtape a positive review, saying "Meek can capably flow, but he’s not nearly the consistent presence on the mic as, say, a Young Jeezy or a Rick Ross—partly because he just flat-out refuses to switch up the delivery. Ultimately, a fairly strong guest list and a good ear for beats is enough to carry this project."

Accolades 
The mixtape was named the 14th best album of 2012 by Complex Magazine. MTV also named the mixtape the 19th best album of 2012.

Track listing 

Sample credits
 "Ready or Not" contains a sample of "Ready or Not" as performed by The Fugees.
 "The Ride" contains a sample of "The Ride" as performed by Drake.

References 

2012 mixtape albums
Warner Music Group albums
Meek Mill albums
DJ Drama albums
Albums produced by Jahlil Beats
Albums produced by Key Wane
Albums produced by Sap (producer)
Sequel albums
Albums produced by Southside (record producer)
Albums produced by Cardiak